Peter Wallach (born 30 October 1938) is a German sprinter. He competed in the men's 4 × 100 metres relay at the 1964 Summer Olympics.

References

External links
 

1938 births
Living people
Athletes (track and field) at the 1964 Summer Olympics
German male sprinters
Olympic athletes of the United Team of Germany
Place of birth missing (living people)